The Barbadori Altarpiece is a painting by Filippo Lippi, dated to 1438 and housed in the Louvre Museum of Paris.

History
Gherardo di Bartolomeo Barbadori, who died childless in 1429, left his heritage to the Captains of Orsanmichele for the realization, in the church of Santo Spirito, of a chapel dedicated to Saint Fridianus. The chapel was built in the old sacristy of the church and in 1433 it was decided to place an altarpiece there. The work was commissioned to Filippo Lippi around 1437, and a letter from Piero de' Medici to Domenico Veneziano, dated 1 April 1438, mentions the altarpiece as having not been finished yet.

The painting remained in Santo Spirito until 1810, when it was disassembled and brought to France by the Napoleonic troops. After the 1815 restoration it was not given back.

Description
The panel follows the traditional polyptych pattern of the time only in the upper part, which has arcades and columns. Also differently from previous works, Lippi painted the Virgin as standing, and made her the central point of the composition.

The angel on the left pulling up his garment is inspired by Nanni di Banco's group of the "Quattro Coronati", a sculpture in a niche of Orsanmichele. Another element of innovation (introduced at the same time by Fra Angelico) was the lack of a gilded background, replaced by an architectural space with a window opening to hilly landscape, inspired to Flemish contemporary works. The shell-shaped niche in the background, a typical element of 15th century Florentine painting, and of Lippi in particular, is inspired by a niche in the Tribunale of the Mercanzie in Orsanmichele, designed by Donatello.

The kneeling saints are St. Augustine on the right and St. Fridianus on the left. On the far left is a self-portrait of Lippi, identified as the young monk behind the balustrade.

The work was originally accompanied by a predella, which was returned to Florence after the fall of Napoleon and is now housed in the Uffizi Gallery in Florence. It includes three panels depicting St. Fridianus Changing the Course of the Serchio, An Angel Foretells the Virgin Mary's Death to Her, with the Arrival of the Apostles and St Augustine's Vision of the Holy Spirit.

Predella of the  Barbadori Altarpiece

References

Sources

External links

Page about the painting 

1438 paintings
Paintings of the Madonna and Child by Filippo Lippi
Paintings in the Louvre by Italian artists
Altarpieces
Paintings of Augustine of Hippo